Tahulalepididae is an extinct family of jawless fish belonging to the order Birkeniiformes.

References

External links
 

Prehistoric jawless fish families
Birkeniiformes